Local elections were held in the United Kingdom in 1993. The results showed a decline for the governing Conservative Party with the third placed party, the Liberal Democrats, gaining most seats.

The main opposition Labour Party, now led by  John Smith following Neil Kinnock's resignation as party leader, gained 111 seats, bringing their number of councillors to 9,213.  Their share of the vote was projected to be 39%, their highest since 1990.

The governing Conservative Party lost 486 seats and were left with 7,802 councillors.  Their projected share of the vote was 31%, a 15% decline since the previous local elections in 1992.

The Liberal Democrats gained 395 seats and had 4,123 councillors after the elections.  Their projected share of the vote was 25%, an increase in 5% from the 1992 local elections.

Summary of results

England

Non-metropolitan county councils

These were the last elections to the county councils of Avon, Berkshire, Cleveland, Hereford and Worcester, Humberside and Isle of Wight before they were abolished by the Local Government Commission for England (1992).

‡ New electoral division boundaries

Sui generis

Northern Ireland

Wales

County councils

These were the last elections to the county councils before they were abolished by the Local Government (Wales) Act 1994.

References

Local elections 2006. House of Commons Library Research Paper 06/26.
Vote 2001 BBC News